The Hardy Trophy is a Canadian sport trophy, presented annually to the winner of the Canada West Universities Athletic Association Football Conference of U Sports, the country's governing body for university athletics. It is named for Evan Hardy, the former head of the agricultural engineering department at the University of Saskatchewan, who had played for the Huskies for its first five years before a rule that only students could play. Hardy continued on as coach and created a western university league. The original trophy was replaced in 1997 after it fell apart during an on-field celebration of the Huskies win in 1996 at home at Griffiths Stadium. The original Hardy trophy was unearthed beneath a pile of storage boxes in 2008 at the University of Saskatchewan. Since 2018, the trophy has been with Canada West conference staff, and has occasionally been displayed at conference football events.

The winner of the Hardy Trophy goes on to play in either the Uteck Bowl or the Mitchell Bowl, depending on annual rotations.

The game in which the Hardy Trophy is awarded to the winner is often referred to as the Hardy Cup.

Game/regular season results

Wins
 Saskatchewan Huskies - 21 *(22)
 Calgary Dinos - 18
 Alberta Golden Bears - 16 *(18)
 UBC Thunderbirds - 15 *(16)
 Manitoba Bisons - 11 *(12)
 Regina Rams - 1
 Simon Fraser Clan - 1

( ) indicates the number of titles including years when the title was shared

Notes

References 

U Sports football trophies and awards